O Il (born 1 January 1978) is a North Korean table tennis player. He competed in the men's singles event at the 2004 Summer Olympics.

References

External links
 

1978 births
Living people
North Korean male table tennis players
Olympic table tennis players of North Korea
Table tennis players at the 2004 Summer Olympics
Place of birth missing (living people)
Table tennis players at the 2002 Asian Games
21st-century North Korean people